Sharp Point Press is a Taiwanese publisher of manga and music. It was founded in July 1982.

History
1982 - Company established. Mainly publishes military and models related books.
1985 - Started publishing annual Zodiac fortune telling handbook.
1987 - Created Taiwan's first magazine on TV Games in July, started another TV Game magazine, TV Game Report in October.
1990 - Started the Anime, manga, model information magazine, Magic Zone.  Also officially started manga publication.
End of 1990 - Company is listed on the sharemarkets.
1991 - Obtained Japanese manga license for Rumiko Takahashi's Urusei Yatsura
1992 - Published idol photo albums of Hong Kong singers/movie stars like Leon Lai, Aaron Kwok.
1993 - Started other TV games magazine like VV Kids, Game Paradise, and Seinen manga magazine Tempo.
1994 - Started publishing a fashion living fortune telling magazine My Birthday.
1996 - Imported the trading card game Magic: The Gathering.
2001 - TOM Group brought Sharp Point Press
July 25, 2003 - Due to Da Ran Culture Ltd.'s bankruptcy, Sharp Point Press obtained publishing rights to Ribon's Mon Mon, which became Taiwan's best selling magazine.
August 12, 2007 - Sharp Point Press obtained license for Shogakukan's Ciao.

See also
:Category:Sharp Point Press titles

External links

Manga distributors
Music publishing companies
Publishing companies of Taiwan
Publishing companies established in 1982
1982 establishments in Taiwan
Music organizations based in Taiwan